Stivers may refer to 

 Terri Stivers, a fictional character in Homicide: Life on the Street
 Stivers School for the Arts, Dayton, Ohio, U.S.

People with the surname
 Ben Stivers, American piano, organ, and keyboard player
 Don Stivers (1926–2009), American artist
 Gregory N. Stivers (born 1960), American judge
 John D. Stivers (1861–1935), American newspaper publisher and politician
 Moses D. Stivers (1828–1895), American politician
 Robert Stivers (born 1961), American politician
 Robert Stivers (photographer) (born 1953), American photographer
 Robert L. Stivers (born 1940), American theologian
 Skippy Stivers, American college football and baseball player
 Steve Stivers (born 1965), American politician
 Thomas W. Stivers (1850–1877), American soldier

See also 
 Stiver, currency